William Hudson may refer to:

Science and medicine
William Hudson (botanist) (1730–1793), British botanist
William Hudson (engineer) (1896–1978), New Zealand-born head of Snowy Mountains Scheme in Australia
William Henry Hudson (1841–1922), Anglo-Argentine writer and naturalist

Sports
Bill Hudson (rugby league), rugby league footballer of the 1940s and 1950s for Great Britain, Yorkshire, England, Batley, Wigan, and Wakefield Trinity
William Hudson (footballer) (1928–2014), British footballer
Frank Hudson (baseball) (William Henry Hudson), American baseball player in the 1940s

Others

William Hudson (actor) (1919–1974), American actor
William Hudson (conductor) (1933–2022), American conductor
William L. Hudson (1794–1862), United States Navy officer
William Parker Hudson (1841–1912), Ontario businessman and political figure
William Wilson Hudson (1808–1859), president of the University of Missouri
William Hudson (Philadelphia), mayor of Philadelphia, 1725–1726
Private William Hudson, a character in the 1986 film Aliens, played by Bill Paxton

See also
Bill Hudson (disambiguation)